Formed in 1985, the University of Maryland Biotechnology Institute (UMBI) is part of the University System of Maryland. It was created to provide a unified focus for Maryland's biotechnology research and education.

About UMBI

The University of Maryland Biotechnology Institute is a hub of intensive study into the applied science of biotechnology and its application to human health, the marine environment, agriculture, and protein engineering/structural biology.

UMBI's four centers conduct research and training that provide a core of expertise and facilities to advance the state's scientific and economic development.

UMBI emphasizes collaboration with industry, other research institutions, and federal laboratories; and sponsors training workshops, short courses, symposia, and seminars throughout the year.

Centers

It comprises four centers:

Center for Advanced Research in Biotechnology (CARB)
Center for Biosystems Research (CBR)
Center of Marine Biotechnology (COMB)
Medical Biotechnology Center (MBC)

UMBI Central Administration is currently located in the Columbus Center in the Inner Harbor, Baltimore, Maryland. The Columbus Center's Hall of Exploration was used at the home for a short-lived marine biotechnology museum from May through December 1997.

See also
Cloth filter, a low cost water treatment developed by academics from UMBI

External links
University of Maryland Biotechnology Institute (UMBI) website

Universities and colleges in Baltimore
University System of Maryland
Biotechnology Institute
Biotechnology Institute
1985 establishments in Maryland
Educational institutions established in 1985